Holzminden is a district in Lower Saxony, Germany, with the town of Holzminden as its administrative capital. It is bounded by (from the north and clockwise) the districts of Hamelin-Pyrmont, Hildesheim and Northeim, and by the state of North Rhine-Westphalia (districts of Höxter and Lippe).

History
The district was established in 1833 within the Duchy of Brunswick-Lüneburg. It was moved to the Prussian Province of Hanover as part of a territorial exchange in 1942. The last territorial modification was in 1974.

Geography
The district is located in the Weserbergland mountains, roughly between Hamelin and Göttingen. The Weser River forms the southwestern border of the district and runs through its northern parts.

Coat of arms
The lion is taken from the arms of the County of Everstein; the counts ruled over the region in the 14th century and were the founders of the City of Holzminden. The bar in the bottom is symbolising the Weser River.

Towns and municipalities

Partner regions 
  Głubczyce County, Poland

See also
Metropolitan region Hannover-Braunschweig-Göttingen-Wolfsburg

References

External links

Official website 

 
Districts of Lower Saxony